Claude François Lallemand (January 26, 1790 in Metz – August 25, 1854 in Marseille) was a French physician.

Career
After serving as assistant surgeon in the armies of the Empire, he studied in Paris at the Hotel Dieu under Guillaume Dupuytren, and, from 1819 to 1845, was Professor of Clinical Surgery at Montpellier, with the exception of three years, during which he was suspended for his liberal political expressions. In 1832 he succeeded Jacques Mathieu Delpech (1777–1832) as doyen (dean) of surgery in Montpellier.

His most important work, Recherches anatomico-pathologiques sur l'encéphale et ses dépendances (Paris, 1820–1836), established his reputation, and was translated into many languages.

He was a renowned authority on spermatorrhea.
In 1845 he was elected to the French Academy of Sciences, removed to Paris, and was consulted by patients from every part of Europe. One of his famous patients in Montpellier was Ibrahim Pasha (1789–1848), who became viceroy of Egypt in 1848.

Works
Recherches anatomico-pathologiques sur l'encéphale et ses dépendances, Paris, 1820–1836
Des Pertes séminales involontaires (On involuntary seminal losses), 3 vols, 1836–1842

References

 From Appleton's Cyclopedia, vol. x, p. 144., cited in The Project Gutenberg EBook of Manhood Perfectly Restored

External links
More detailed biography

1790 births
1854 deaths
19th-century French physicians
Physicians from Marseille